Adolf Kasaija Mwesige (born 4 April 1966) is a Ugandan lawyer and politician who served as Minister of Defence and Veterans Affairs in the Cabinet of Uganda from 6 June 2016 to 8 June 2021. He previously served as Minister of Local Government from 18 February 2009 to 6 June 2016. He has also been the elected Member of Parliament for Bunyangabu County, Kabarole District, since 1996. In July 2017, Bunyangabu County was peeled off Kabarole District to form Bunyangabu District.

Background and education
He attended Nyakasura School in Fort Portal for his A-Level education. Mwesige holds a Bachelor of Laws from Makerere University, Uganda's oldest university. He also holds a diploma in legal practice from the Law Development Centre in Kampala. He holds a diploma in international law from the Public Administration Promotion Center in Berlin, Germany and a diploma in human rights law from the United Nations Center for Human Rights in Geneva, Switzerland.

Work experience
Mwesige has been enrolled as an Advocate of the High Court of Uganda since 1994. Between 1992 and 1996, he worked in the Ministry of Foreign Affairs, as a foreign service officer responsible for legal and consular matters. Between 1996 and 2001, he worked as the managing partner at Mwesige, Egunyu & Company Advocates, a Ugandan law firm.

He was first elected to Parliament in 1996, to represent Bunyangabu County in Kabarole District. Before 2009, Mwesige served as Minister for General Duties in the Office of the Prime Minister. He was appointed as Minister of Local Government on 18 February 2009. In the cabinet reshuffle of 27 May 2011, Mwesige retained his local government portfolio. He acted as vice-chair of the Commonwealth Local Government Forum from 2011 until he was moved to the post of Minister of Defense on 6 June 2016, replacing Crispus Kiyonga, who was dropped from the cabinet. He was replaced in this position by Vincent Ssempijja on 8 June 2021.

Family
Adolf Mwesige is a married father.

See also
 Cabinet of Uganda
 Parliament of Uganda

References

External links
Website of the Parliament of Uganda

1966 births
Living people
Toro people
People from Bunyangabu District
20th-century Ugandan lawyers
Makerere University alumni
Members of the Parliament of Uganda
Government ministers of Uganda
Western Region, Uganda
Law Development Centre alumni
21st-century Ugandan politicians
Defense ministers of Uganda